The Newfoundland referendums of 1948 were a series of two referendums to decide the political future of the Dominion of Newfoundland. Before the referendums, Newfoundland was in debt and went through several delegations to determine whether the country would join Canada, remain under British rule or regain independence. The voting for the referendums occurred on June 3 and July 22, 1948. The eventual result was for Newfoundland to enter into Confederation.

Background
Newfoundland was the first region in that what would become Canada to be settled by Europeans, but was the last to obtain either a local representative government or responsible government. In 1832, it received local representative government in the form of a locally elected body of officials overseen by a governor. The British granted responsible government, in which the government is responsible to the legislature and elected officials occupy ministerial jobs, only in 1855.

Newfoundland did not send any delegates to the 1864 Charlottetown Conference, which was to discuss a union of Maritime colonies. Later that year, Newfoundland attended the Quebec Conference, called by John A. Macdonald to discuss a greater British North America union. The two Newfoundland delegates, Frederick Carter and Ambrose Shea, returned in favour of a union with Canada.  However, Confederation was highly unpopular with the Newfoundland public, and the Government of Newfoundland did not send representatives to the London Conference of 1866, in which the British government and the colonies agreed to the terms the British North America Act. Opponents of Confederation decisively won the 1869 Newfoundland general election. In 1907, Newfoundland became a self-governing Dominion separate from Canada.

By the 1920s and the 1930s, Newfoundland was almost $40 million in debt, and on the verge of economic collapse.  A commission recommended Newfoundland to be "given a rest from party politics" and to be administered by a special Commission of Government. Chaired by the governor, it would consist of three people from Newfoundland and three from the United Kingdom. Backing the recommendation was the United Kingdom, which agreed to take on Newfoundland's debts. The Commission of Government began on February 16, 1934.

Prosperity returned when the Americans were invited to the island by Britain to set up military bases in 1941 to 1945. The American Bases Act became law in Newfoundland on June 11, 1941. Newfoundland girls married American personnel by the thousands. In 1948 there was a short-lived but growing movement for some sort of economic union with the United States.

The British government, keen to cut expenditure after World War II, hoped that Newfoundland would decide to join confederation and end the rule by commission.  Newfoundland first asked Canada for help in a return to responsible government. However, the response from the Canadian government was that it was not interested in helping Newfoundland economically unless Newfoundland joined Confederation.

The British did not want their colony to become an American possession, and the Canadian government, despite being convinced that absorbing Newfoundland would not benefit Canada economically, thought that the annexation would be the lesser of two evils when compared to the prospect of the country being almost completely surrounded by American territory.

Seeking a union with the United States was not a referendum option, despite the idea having some currency amongst locals. With the Cold War looming, U.S. interests in Newfoundland were centred primarily on its strategic importance to the defence of North America. The Americans' ability to maintain bases on the island satisfied those concerns — after receiving assurances that the Canadian government would honour the leases for bases on Newfoundland, the U.S. State Department had no further interest in the political future of Newfoundland. President Harry S. Truman's administration had little incentive to pursue annexation. With respect to foreign policy, such a territorial ambition would have only served to antagonize two key allies. With respect to domestic policy, the administration would not likely have been able to convince Congress to offer statehood to Newfoundland due to its small population and geographical isolation from the then-48 existing states, and would not likely have been able to convince Newfoundlanders to accept territorial status as an alternative to admission as a U.S. state.

The National Convention

The British government decided to let Newfoundlanders deliberate and choose their own future by calling a National Convention in 1946. Chaired by Judge Cyril J. Fox, it consisted of 45 elected members, one of whom was the future first premier of Newfoundland, Joey Smallwood.

The Convention set up committees to study where Newfoundland's future lay. Many members assumed that the final decision was due near the end of their deliberations, but the timeline was upset when Smallwood moved that the Convention should send a delegation to Ottawa to discuss a union in October 1946.  His motion was defeated, as it only received the support of 17 members, although the Convention later decided to send delegations to both London and Ottawa.

The London Delegation

The London delegation, made up of so-called anti-confederates, preferred that Newfoundland become independent rather than join Canada. The group left Newfoundland on April 25, 1947, and met with a British delegation headed by the Dominions Secretary, Viscount Addison. The British response to the delegation was that it would give no economic help to Newfoundland if it returned to responsible government. The leader of the delegation from Newfoundland, Peter Cashin, gave an angry speech to the Convention on May 19 claiming, "A conspiracy existed to sell this country to the Dominion of Canada".

The Ottawa Delegation

The Ottawa delegation, dominated by pro-confederates including Smallwood, preferred a union with Canada to independence. The talks between them and Ottawa began on June 24, 1947 with the goal being to stay in Ottawa as long as needed to negotiate good terms for Newfoundland's entry. Ottawa was reluctant at first because they felt that the delegation was not an official representation of the Dominion of Newfoundland, but the Federal Cabinet finally decided to begin negotiations on July 18.  By mid-August, the agreement of draft terms was nearly complete.  However, with the death of Frank Bridges, Prime Minister William Lyon Mackenzie King's minister from New Brunswick, negotiations effectively ended.  King refused further discussions until New Brunswick had representation, and so the delegation headed back to St. John's.

Back in St. John's
The Convention reconvened on October 10 and Smallwood presented his delegation's report, infuriating the anti-confederates.  Just as the Convention decided to debate the delegation's report, the draft terms from Ottawa arrived. Ottawa offered to assume most of the debt, negotiate a tax agreement, and outlined which services would remain in the jurisdiction of the province.

Referendums 
Newfoundland recommended that the British Government hold a referendum on Newfoundland's future. London agreed that a referendum was a good idea, and left it up to the Convention to decide what was to be on the ballot. Originally, the Convention decided that only two choices were to be on the ballot: restoration of responsible government and the continuation of the Commission of Government.

Smallwood moved on January 23, 1948, to add Confederation with Canada to the choices. The debate ended at 5:30a.m. on January 28, with the motion being defeated 29–16.  The British government intervened in March and overruled the Convention, deciding that Confederation with Canada would indeed be on the ballot.  They did this after having concluded, "It would not be right that the people of Newfoundland should be deprived of an opportunity of considering the issue at the referendum".

The factions
Three main factions actively campaigned during the lead up to the referendums. One faction, led by Smallwood, was the Confederate Association (CA) advocating entering into Confederation. They campaigned through a newspaper known as The Confederate. The Responsible Government League (RGL), led by Peter Cashin, advocated an independent Newfoundland with a return to responsible government. They also had their own newspaper The Independent. A third smaller Economic Union Party (EUP), led by Chesley Crosbie, advocated closer economic ties with the United States.

The first referendum
The first referendum took place on June 3, 1948. The votes were as follows:

The second referendum
Since none of the choices had gained over 50%, a second referendum with only the two most popular choices was scheduled for July 22, 1948. Both sides recognized that more people had voted against responsible government than for it, which encouraged the CA and discouraged its opponents, although the RGL and EUP now became allies. The confederates widely publicized the Roman Catholic Archbishop E. P. Roche's strong opposition to confederation, and persuaded the Loyal Orange Association to advise Protestants to resist Catholic influence. The CA also denounced anti-confederates as anti-British and pro-republican, and called confederation with Canada "British Union". Anti-confederates responded that "Confederation Means British Union With French Canada".

The results of the second referendum were:

Results map 

The Avalon Peninsula, the location of St. John's, supported responsible government in both referendums, while the rest of Newfoundland supported confederation. A majority of districts with mostly Catholic voters supported responsible government.

Reaction to the referendums
As the results of the binding referendum were to join Canada, Newfoundland began to negotiate with Canada to enter into Confederation. After negotiations were completed, the British Government received the terms and the British North America Act 1949 was subsequently passed by the British Parliament and given Royal Assent. Newfoundland officially joined Canada at midnight, March 31, 1949. At the elections for the Newfoundland House of Assembly two months later, Smallwood's Liberal Party won and controlled the provincial government until the 1970s. Reactions to Confederation were mixed.

Newfoundland as a province secured some significant guarantees as a part of the union. As ruled by the Judicial Committee of the Privy Council in 1927, Canada agreed to put Labrador under the jurisdiction of Newfoundland, after some consideration.  Such commitments carried over to other areas as well, such as a ferry between Port aux Basques and North Sydney, and a guarantee that Newfoundland would be able to continue to manufacture and sell margarine, a very controversial product at the time.

Canada welcomed Newfoundland into confederation, as seen in an editorial in The Globe and Mail on April 1, 1949:

An editorial from the Montreal Gazette also welcomed Newfoundland, saying:

The Vancouver Sun also reflected on the results, saying:

References

Further reading

External links
 The Newfoundland Referendums of June 3 and July 22, 1948
 Newfoundland History

Sovereignty referendums
1948
Newfoundland referendums
Newfoundland referendums
Newfoundland referendums
Referendums in the Dominion of Newfoundland
Newfoundland referendums, 1948
Political history of Newfoundland and Labrador
Newfoundland referendums
Dominion of Newfoundland
Referendums
Newfoundland referendums
Newfoundland referendums
Multiple-choice referendums
Newfoundland